Michael Trajkovski is an Australian professional footballer who plays a striker for Canterbury Bankstown.

External links

References

Living people
1997 births
Australian soccer players
Association football midfielders
Western Sydney Wanderers FC players
Sydney Olympic FC players
A-League Men players
Australian people of Macedonian descent